Doina Popescu (born 1 October 1938) is a Romanian volleyball player. She competed in the women's tournament at the 1964 Summer Olympics.

References

1938 births
Living people
Romanian women's volleyball players
Olympic volleyball players of Romania
Volleyball players at the 1964 Summer Olympics
People from Codlea